Mount Boardman is located in the Diablo Range in California. The summit is near a point where Santa Clara, Alameda, Stanislaus, and San Joaquin counties meet. It was named for W. F. Boardman, the Alameda County surveyor between 1865 and 1869.

This north peak, unnamed on topographic maps, is located on the Alameda – San Joaquin county line, and is the highest point in San Joaquin County. Some snow falls on both peaks during the winter.

References

See also
List of highest points in California by county

Diablo Range
Mountains of Alameda County, California
Mountains of Santa Clara County, California
Mountains of San Joaquin County, California
Mountains of Stanislaus County, California
Geography of the San Joaquin Valley
Mountains of the San Francisco Bay Area
Mountains of Northern California